The Amalgamated Society of Coopers was a trade union representing coopers in the United Kingdom and Ireland.

A National Association of Coopers, bringing together local unions, existed from 1854 until 1868, when a lengthy strike led it to collapse.   Most of the local union survived, and by 1878 there was a desire to again form a national organisation.  That year, thirteen unions formed the Mutual Association of Journeymen Coopers, which attempted to co-ordinate activity, but permitted each affiliate to control its own money and retain a high level of autonomy.  The government of the union was rotated between different branches.

By 1888, the union had grown to 4,000 members in 27 affiliates, and this continued to grow, with the following unions affiliated by 1910:

In 1919, the union renamed itself as the Amalgamated Society of Coopers.  Despite its national scope, several rival coopers' unions existed, including the National Association of Coopers.  In 1926, the Amalgamated Society, the National Association and three smaller unions formed the Coopers' Federation of Great Britain.  The Amalgamated Society remained in existence as an affiliate, but declined in importance.  In 1970, it merged fully into the federation.

General Secretaries
E. Girling
1902: J. Carroll
1907: John Connell
1908: John Shankie
1909: A. J. Spiller
1911: George William Harrison
1914: R. W. Mann
1940s: T. B. Ford

References

Trade unions established in 1878
Trade unions disestablished in 1970
Coopers' trade unions
Trade unions based in London